Pregnancy-specific beta-1-glycoprotein 3 is a protein that in humans is encoded by the PSG3 gene.

References

Further reading